836 Jole (prov. designation:  or ) is a bright background asteroid from the inner regions of the asteroid belt. It was discovered on 23 September 1916, by German astronomer Max Wolf at the Heidelberg Observatory in southwest Germany. It was named after Iole, wife of Heracles from Greek mythology.

Orbit and classification 

Located in the orbital region of the Flora family, Jole is a non-family asteroid of the main belt's background population when applying the hierarchical clustering method to its proper orbital elements. It orbits the Sun in the inner asteroid belt at a distance of 1.8–2.6 AU once every 3 years and 3 months (1,184 days; semi-major axis of 2.19 AU). Its orbit has an eccentricity of 0.18 and an inclination of 5° with respect to the ecliptic. The asteroid was first observed as A903 QA at Heidelberg Observatory on 24 August 1903, where the body's observation arc begins on the following night.

Naming 

Based on Lutz Schmadel's own research, this minor planet was named from Greek mythology, after Iole, daughter of King Eurytus of Oechalia and wife by force of divine hero Heracles. The naming was not mentioned in The Names of the Minor Planets by Paul Herget in 1955.

Physical characteristics 

In the SDSS-based taxonomy, Jole is a common, stony S-type asteroid.

Rotation period 

In September 2010, a rotational lightcurve of Jole was obtained from photometric observations by Daniel Coley at the DanHenge Observatory  at the Center for Solar System Studies. Lightcurve analysis gave a well-defined rotation period of  hours with a brightness variation of  magnitude.

Diameter and albedo 

The Collaborative Asteroid Lightcurve Link assumes an albedo for a Florian asteroid of 0.24 and calculates a diameter of 6.21 kilometers based on an absolute magnitude of 13.2.

Notes

References

External links 
 Lightcurve Database Query (LCDB), at www.minorplanet.info
 Dictionary of Minor Planet Names, Google books
 Discovery Circumstances: Numbered Minor Planets (1)-(5000) – Minor Planet Center
 
 

000836
Discoveries by Max Wolf
Named minor planets
19160923